An inhabited initial is an initial, an enlarged letter at the beginning of a paragraph or other section of text that contains an illustration of human or animal figures within the letter. It is similar to a historiated initial; however, the figures in historiated initials show an identifiable scene or story, while the figures in inhabited initials do not show a narrative. Figures in inhabited initials may be related to the contents of the text, but do not have to be. They may be purely decorative instead.

See also
Historiated initial
Lombardic capitals

References

Iconography of illuminated manuscripts
Book design
Iconography
Visual motifs